Events from the year 1811 in Germany.

Incumbents

Kingdoms 
 Kingdom of Prussia
 Monarch – Frederick William III of Prussia (16 November 1797 – 7 June 1840)
 Kingdom of Bavaria
 Maximilian I (1 January 1806 – 13 October 1825)
 Kingdom of Saxony
 Frederick Augustus I (20 December 1806 – 5 May 1827)
 Kingdom of Württemberg
 Frederick I (22 December 1797 – 30 October 1816)

Grand Duchies 
 Grand Duke of Baden
 Charles Frederick (25 July 1806 – 10 June 1811)
 Charles 10 June 1811 – 8 December 1818
 Grand Duke of Hesse
 Louis I (14 August 1806 – 6 April 1830)
 Grand Duke of Mecklenburg-Schwerin
 Frederick Francis I– (24 April 1785 – 1 February 1837)
 Grand Duke of Mecklenburg-Strelitz
 Charles II (2 June 1794 – 6 November 1816)
 Grand Duke of Oldenburg
 Wilhelm (6 July 1785 –2 July 1823 ) Due to mental illness, Wilhelm was duke in name only, with his cousin Peter, Prince-Bishop of Lübeck, acting as regent throughout his entire reign.
 Peter I (2 July 1823 - 21 May 1829)
 Grand Duke of Saxe-Weimar-Eisenach
 Karl August  (1809–1815)

Principalities 
 Schaumburg-Lippe
 George William (13 February 1787 - 1860)
 Schwarzburg-Rudolstadt
 Friedrich Günther (28 April 1807 - 28 June 1867)
 Schwarzburg-Sondershausen
 Günther Friedrich Karl I (14 October 1794 - 19 August 1835)
 Principality of Lippe
 Leopold II (5 November 1802 - 1 January 1851)
 Principality of Reuss-Greiz
 Heinrich XIII (28 June 1800-29 January 1817)
 Waldeck and Pyrmont
 Friedrich Karl August  (29 August 1763 – 24 September 1812)

Duchies 
 Duke of Anhalt-Dessau
 Leopold III (16 December 1751 – 9 August 1817)
 Duke of Brunswick
 Frederick William (16 October 1806 – 16 June 1815)
 Duke of Saxe-Altenburg
 Duke of Saxe-Hildburghausen (1780–1826)  - Frederick
 Duke of Saxe-Coburg and Gotha
 Ernest I (9 December 1806 – 12 November 1826)
 Duke of Saxe-Meiningen
 Bernhard II (24 December 1803–20 September 1866)
 Duke of Schleswig-Holstein-Sonderburg-Beck
 Frederick Charles Louis (24 February 1775 – 25 March 1816)

Events 
 21 November – German poet Heinrich von Kleist shoots his terminally ill lover Henriette Vogel and then himself, on the shore of the Kleiner Wannsee near Potsdam.
 Johann Nepomuk Hummel – 12 German Dances and Coda for Redout-Deutsche
 Forstbotanischer Garten Tharandt established
 Royal Saxon Academy of Forestry established

Births 
 27 January – Ernst Dieffenbach, German scientist (d. 1855)
 30 or 31 March – Robert Bunsen, German chemist, inventor (d. 1899)
 30 September – Augusta of Saxe-Weimar-Eisenach, German empress (d. 1890)
 25 October – C. F. W. Walther, German-American theologian (d. 1887)
 21 November – Ludwig Preiss, German-born British botanical collector (d. 1883)
 28 November – King Maximilian II of Bavaria (d. 1864)
 3 December – Eduard Bendemann, German painter (d. 1889)
 5 December – Justus Carl Hasskarl, German explorer, botanist (d. 1894)

Deaths 

 11 January – Christoph Friedrich Nicolai writer and bookseller (b. 1733)
 3 February – Johann Beckmann, scientist (b. 1739)
 19 July – Christian Gotthilf Tag, composer (b. 1735)
 September – Ulrich Jasper Seetzen, German explorer (b. 1767)
 8 September – Peter Simon Pallas, German zoologist (b. 1741)
 21 November – Heinrich von Kleist, German writer (suicide) (b. 1777)

References 

Years of the 19th century in Germany

 
Germany
Germany